Dark Satellites is a 2022 German drama film based on a collection of short stories by Clemens Meyer.

Cast
 Martina Gedeck - Christa
 Nastassja Kinski - Birgitt
 Albrecht Schuch - Jens
 Peter Kurth - Hans
 Irina Starshenbaum - Marika
 Lilith Stangenberg - Aischa
 Adel Bencherif - Hamed
 Charly Hübner - Erik

References

External links 

2022 drama films
German drama films